The 1929 Tour of Flanders was held on March 17, 1929.

General classification

Final general classification

References
Résultats sur siteducyclisme.net
Résultats sur cyclebase.nl

External links
 

Tour of Flanders
1929 in road cycling
1929 in Belgian sport